The Virginia Slims Championships was held twice in 1986 because of a change of schedule from March to November.

It was the sixteenth season-ending WTA Tour Championships, the annual tennis tournament for the best female tennis players in singles on the 1986 WTA Tour. It was held from 17 to 23 November 1986 in New York City, New York, United States.

Finals

Singles 

  Martina Navratilova defeated  Steffi Graf 7–6(8–6), 6–3, 6–2

Doubles 

   Martina Navratilova /   Pam Shriver defeated   Claudia Kohde-Kilsch /  Helena Suková 7–6(7–1), 6–3

References

External links 
 WTA tournament edition details
 ITF tournament edition details

WTA Tour Championships
Virginia Slims Championships
Virginia Slims Championships
Virginia Slims Championships
1980s in Manhattan
Virginia Slims Championships
Madison Square Garden
Sports competitions in New York City
Sports in Manhattan
Tennis tournaments in New York City